Lithospermum leymebambensis is a flowering plant of the family Boraginaceae found in Peru, particularly in Amotape District and Huancabamba Province.

References

leymebambensis
Flora of Peru
Plants described in 2010